William Forsyth (1996 – 11 May 2020) was a British professional rugby league footballer who played as a  for the Dewsbury Rams in the Kingstone Press Championship. He later played two games for Hemel Stags.

Forsyth died on 11 May 2020, at the age of 24 from cancer.

References

External links
Dewsbury Rams profile

Place of birth missing
Place of death missing
1996 births
2020 deaths
Rugby league fullbacks
Dewsbury Rams players
Deaths from cancer in the United Kingdom